PixMob is a wireless lighting technology of Eski Inc. that controls wearable LED devices: by using the wearable objects as pixels, an event's audience itself can become a display. The light effects produced by these LED devices can be controlled to match a light show, pulsate in sync with the music, react to the body movement, etc.

PixMob was developed by the Montreal-based company Eski Inc. in 2010. The technology comes in different versions providing different ways to wirelessly control any of the objects. The latest version, PixMob VIDEO, debuted during the Super Bowl XLVIII Halftime Show.

Technology 

PixMob technology uses infrared to light up RGB LEDs that are embedded in different objects such as balls or wristbands. These wearable objects are given to an audience, transforming each individual into a pixel during the show. To light up each pixel (i.e. each LED), commands are sent from computers to transmitters that emit invisible light (infrared). The infrared signal is picked up by infrared receivers in each object and goes through a tiny 8-bit microprocessor to light up the LEDs. The type of transmitter involved differs depending on the selected version of the technology. Wash fixtures or lekos, typically seen in the live entertainment industry, are usually used. For the PixMob video technology, VT transmitters beam video instructions onto the audience, almost like a matrix creating a virtual map. With this technology, the infrared receiver decodes the signal differently depending on each pixel/person's location. This enables the creation of animated video effects and transforms the audience into a display screen. Despite the low-resolution result due to a low number of pixels, quite detailed video effects can be achieved on a large canvas, using bright colors and bold movements.

Uses

Microsoft Kinect Launch 

The technology debuted at the Microsoft Kinect Launch in June 2010, where white satin ponchos embedded with wirelessly-controlled LEDs were used to integrate the audience into the show.

Arcade Fire – Coachella 2011 

In 2011, Montreal's Arcade Fire used PixMob balls during their encore performance of "Wake Up" at Coachella Festival. The project, entitled Summer Into Dust, was sponsored by The Creators Project and produced by Radical Media. This was made possible due to Arcade Fire, Chris Milk, Moment Factory and Tangible Interaction. More than 1,250 glowing balls were dropped from the stage onto the audience. They contained battery-powered circuit boards studded with full-color LEDs that changed colors in unison, thanks to built-in infrared receivers and microphones.

Tiësto 

Tiësto used PixMob wristbands for his 2014 residency at Hakkasan. During the Super Bowl XLVIII Halftime Show, he tweeted that he would use the video technology for the February 28 show at Hakkasan Las Vegas Restaurant and Nightclub.

Super Bowl XLVIII Halftime Show 

PixMob launched their video version of the technology at the 2014 Super Bowl XLVIII halftime show. Each spectator received a black knitted hat called a "video ski hat" embedded with 3 LEDs and an infrared receiver. Just before the show, spectators were asked to put on their hats and remain seated to form a huge display. Wearing the video ski hats, each spectator became a pixel in a giant human screen composed of 80,000 pixels. Touchdown Entertainment, the company that produced the event, claimed it was "the largest ever LED screen". The spectators saw different kinds of visuals effects including a Pepsi logo moving around the stadium as well as images of the live Red Hot Chili Peppers' performance and fireworks display.

Microsoft Xbox E3 2015 

Microsoft issued Pixmob pendants bearing the Xbox logo on neck-lanyard style ribbons to attendees of the Xbox presentation at the 2015 E3 convention.

Videotron Centre opening 

Quebecor Media utilized Pixmob bracelets during the opening ceremony of Videotron Centre in Quebec City, Quebec, September 12, 2015.

Cleveland Cavaliers 2015 Home Opener 

The Cleveland Cavaliers provided each fan with a customized Pixmob bracelet during their home opener against the Miami Heat at the Quicken Loans Arena on October 30, 2015. The bracelets were used in a patriotic display during the national anthem and through the game.

Target - Star Wars Galactic Experience - LA Live 

The event Target in L.A. Live in the Galaxy Show Dome, families took a virtual adventure through space as they watched a light show projected on the ceiling, featuring favorite characters' portraits rendered in stars, with X-Wings and TIE Fighters zooming in and out of light speed. Visitors received special bracelets that lit up and interacted with the visuals and music.

World Masters Games 2017 Auckland 

The opening ceremony of the 2017 World Masters Games in Auckland, New Zealand, used PixMob wrist bands as part of the light show. The bands also lit in different colours to signify when each sporting group was due to leave their seats and join the parade.

American Idol Finale 2018 

Each studio audience member of the 2018 American Idol Finale was given a PixMob wrist band for a colored lighting effect. The colors were arranged in rows and lit accordingly. This included a multi-color glow while a duet performance of "Rainbow Connection" between winner Maddie Poppe and Kermit the Frog played onstage.

The Weeknd's After Hours til Dawn Tour 

During Canadian musician The Weeknd's After Hours til Dawn Tour, PixMob's wristbands were provided to each attendee at each concert, and during the final two songs, every wrist band in the respective stadiums lit up simultaneously.

Coldplay's Music of the Spheres World Tour 

During Coldplay's Music of the Spheres World Tour, PixMob wristbands were offered to every audience member prior to entering the performance area of the venue. They were illuminated in a timed and coordinated manner to provide enhanced lighting and animation effects across the entire venue audience. Most songs would have their own unique wristband illumination 'theme'.

Bad Bunny’s World’s Hottest Tour 
During Bad Bunny’s World's Hottest Tour PixMob wristbands were offered to every audience member prior to entering the performance area of the venue. It was the first time that a latin singer offers pixmob wristbands at a Stadium tour, all the wristbands were gifted to the fans with a branded image of the tour and a QR code for donating to non-governmental organizations of Puerto Rico.

Elton John's Farewell Yellow Brick Road Tour 

One instance of Sir Elton John's farewell concert tour was performed at Dodgers Stadium on November 20, 2022.  Audience members were given Pixmob wristbands at the entrance; these were fitted with a wide satin ribbon and an adjustable silicone cinch.  The concert was streamed on Disney+, where wide shots of the crowd revealed that Pixmobs were used to produce effects such as solid white; a slow, pulsing field of color; or a dazzling explosion of "stars" timed to thunder and lightning that was seen and heard from the stage.

Swedish House Mafia's Paradise Again World Tour 
During Swedish House Mafia's Paradise Again World Tour, PixMob wristbands were offered to every audience member prior to entering the performance area of the venue. They were illuminated in a timed and coordinated manner to provide enhanced lighting and animation effects across the entire venue audience. Most songs would have their own unique wristband illumination 'theme'.

Inspirations 

Several sources of inspiration for the technology have been given by its inventors, David Parent and Vincent Leclerc, in interviews: the use of lighters in concerts, the Burning Man festival, fire rituals, as well as the large human screens made from crowd members holding placards in Korea. The co-founders explain that their goal is to augment the collective experience of being part of a show.

References

External links 

 PixMob official site

Light-emitting diodes